Nephele leighi is a moth of the family Sphingidae. It is known from the Seychelles.

References

Nephele (moth)
Moths described in 1921
Fauna of Seychelles